The 1998–99 Euro Hockey Tour was the third season of the Euro Hockey Tour. The season consisted of four tournaments, the Česká Pojišťovna Cup, Karjala Tournament, Baltica Brewery Cup, and the Sweden Hockey Games. The games Canada participated in did not count towards the final standings of the tournament.

Tournaments

Česká Pojišťovna Cup

Karjala Tournament

Baltica Brewery Cup

Sweden Hockey Games

Final standings

References
Euro Hockey Tour website

Euro Hockey Tour
1998–99 in European ice hockey
1998–99 in Canadian ice hockey
1998–99 in Russian ice hockey
1998–99 in Czech ice hockey
1998–99 in Swedish ice hockey
1998–99 in Finnish ice hockey